Arsan Duolai is a Yakut god of the underworld. His servant spirits are tasked with the collection of cattle and horses for sacrifices.

Yakut mythology
Turkic deities

Underworld gods